Merlin Röhl (born 5 July 2002) is a German professional footballer who plays as a midfielder for  club SC Freiburg and SC Freiburg II.

Early life
Röhl was born in Potsdam and grew up there.

Club career
Röhl started his youth career at SV Babelsberg 03, but moved to FC Ingolstadt in 2018 having had a trial spell at the club after sharing his performance data through the app Tonsser. He signed a long-term contract with the club in January 2020. 

Röhl made his debut for Ingolstadt on 25 November 2020, starting in a 3–1 3. Liga win away to Bayern Munich II. He scored his first senior goal on 16 December 2020 with a right-footed volley in the 37th minute of a 1–0 league victory over Hansa Rostock.

On 17 August 2022, Röhl signed with SC Freiburg in Bundesliga.

International career
Röhl has represented Germany at both under-18 and under-19 levels.

Style of play
Röhl is a midfielder, but has also played at left-back. He is both-footed and is known for his agility.

References

External links

Living people
2002 births
German footballers
Sportspeople from Potsdam
Footballers from Brandenburg
Association football midfielders
SV Babelsberg 03 players
FC Ingolstadt 04 players
SC Freiburg players
SC Freiburg II players
3. Liga players
2. Bundesliga players
Germany youth international footballers